Goodenia megasepala is a species of flowering plant in the family Goodeniaceae and is endemic to Queensland. It is a prostrate to low-lying herb with toothed or lobed, lance-shaped to narrow elliptic leaves, and racemes of yellow flowers.

Description

Taxonomy and naming
Goodenia megasepala was first formally described in 1980 by Roger Charles Carolin in the journal Telopea from material collected in 1978 by Keith Albert Williams on the Beale Range in Queensland. The specific epithet (megasepala) means "large sepals", distinguishing this species from the similar G. fascicularis.

Distribution and habitat
This goodenia grows in red, sandy soil in central-western Queensland.

Conservation status
Goodenia megasepala is classified as of "least concern" under the Queensland Government Nature Conservation Act 1992.

References

megasepala
Flora of Queensland
Plants described in 1980
Taxa named by Roger Charles Carolin